Jacob L. Martin (died August 26, 1848) was an American diplomat. He held the post of Chief Clerk of the U.S. State Department from July 16, 1840, to March 5, 1841. For just two days, March 4 and March 5, 1841, he held the ad interim chair of the United States Secretary of State.

In 1848 he was appointed chargé d'affaires of the United States to the Holy See. Martin, a Protestant, was chosen over a few candidates who were openly friendly to Vatican. He reached Rome on August 2, 1848, but hesitated to enter the city owing to continuing revolution. Martin presented his credentials to the Holy See on August 19, 1848, but died seven days later and was buried in the city's Protestant Cemetery.

Notes

References
 Connelly, James. The visit of Archbishop Gaetano Bedini to the United States of America. Editrice Pontificia Università Gregoriana. 1960.
 Plischke, Elmer. U.S. Department of State: A Reference History. Westport, CT: Greenwood, 1999. .

United States Department of State officials
19th-century American diplomats
1848 deaths
Year of birth missing
American Protestants
Chief Clerks of the United States Department of State
Acting United States Secretaries of State